Pama Reserve is a partial reserve in Burkina Faso. 
Established in 1955 it is located in Kompienga Province and covers an area of 2237 km. Its eastern border is the Singou river, separating it from two other reserves, Singou and Arli. The western border is the national road N18 from Fada N'Gourma to Porga. In the South the reserve reaches the Pendjari river, being Burkina Faso's border with Benin. The reserve is home to elephants, hippopotamuses, lions and leopards  and 450 species of flowering plants.

References

Protected areas of Burkina Faso
Kompienga Province
Protected areas established in 1955
1955 establishments in French Upper Volta